Benjamín de Arriba y Castro (8 April 1886 – 8 March 1973) was a Catholic cardinal and archbishop.

Biography
He studied at the seminary in Madrid, the Pontifical Gregorian University and Angelicum in Rome, and the Pontifical University of Toledo. Arriba was ordained to the priesthood by Cardinal Rafael Merry del Val on 14 July 1912 and then taught at the Madrid seminary until 1921. After becoming a canon of the cathedral chapter of Madrid on 17 February 1921, he served as secretary of the chamber and government of the same diocese from 1921 to 1930. Arriba was made provisor in 1930, and later vicar general in 1932.

On 1 May 1935 Arriba was appointed Bishop of Mondoñedo by Pope Pius XI. He received his episcopal consecration on the following 16 June from Bishop Leopoldo Eijo y Garay, with Archbishop Prudencio Melo y Alcalde and Bishop Manuel González y García serving as co-consecrators. Arriba was later named Bishop of Oviedo on 8 August 1944 and Archbishop of Tarragona on 22 January 1949.

Pope Pius XII created him Cardinal Priest of Ss. Vitale, Valeria, Gervasio e Protasio in the consistory of 12 January 1953. After participating in the 1958 papal conclave, Arriba attended the Second Vatican Council from 1962 to 1965, and served as a cardinal elector in the conclave of 1963. He resigned as Tarragona's archbishop on 19 November 1970 after a period of twenty-one years.

The Cardinal died at 3:45 p.m. in Barcelona, at age 86. He is buried in a parish church in Tarragona.

External links
Cardinals of the Holy Roman Church
Catholic-Hierarchy

1886 births
1973 deaths
20th-century Spanish cardinals
Cardinals created by Pope Pius XII
Archbishops of Tarragona
Bishops of Oviedo
Participants in the Second Vatican Council
20th-century Roman Catholic archbishops in Spain